Cómo duele callar (English: How Painful Silence), is a Mexican telenovela produced by Eugenio Cobo for Televisa in 1987.

Cynthia Klitbo, Graciela Mauri, Leonardo Daniel and Edgardo Gazcón as protagonists, while Joaquín Cordero and Guillermo García Cantú star as the antagonists.

Plot 
In a small town in Veracruz the story of three family groups bound by secrets, passions, hatred and resentment develops. The first of these consists of two sisters, unscrupulous Aurelia (Alma Muriel) and submissive Eugenia (Nuria Bages) who live alone on the farm of his own, both lay their eyes on the foreman of it, Villegas (Enrique Rocha), a man of passions that will become the source of conflict between the two sisters.

Cast 

 Alma Muriel as Aurelia
 Enrique Rocha as Villegas
 Nuria Bages as Eugenia
 Cynthia Klitbo as Cristina Cisneros
 Joaquín Cordero as Rosendo Cisneros
 Norma Lazareno as Mercedes de Cisneros
 Leonardo Daniel as José Luis
 Graciela Mauri as Rosario
 Edgardo Gazcón as Armando
 Ana Bertha Lepe as Jacinta
 Guillermo García Cantú as Mauro
 Mónica Miguel as Casimira
 Juan Felipe Preciado as Domingo
 René Muñoz as Rufino
 Ricardo de Loera as Pancho
 Genoveva Pérez as Justina
 Graciela Bernardos as Filomena
 Federico Romano as Quirino
 Miguel Rodarte as Félix
 Eugenio Cobo as Padre Antonio
 José Antonio Estrada as Sargento Moreno
 Guillermo Melo Guzmán as Detective

References

External links 

Mexican telenovelas
1987 telenovelas
Televisa telenovelas
1987 Mexican television series debuts
1987 Mexican television series endings
Spanish-language telenovelas